The Norwegian Santal Mission was a Norwegian humanitarian and missionary organisation that was mainly active in India, particularly among the Santhal people. It was affiliated with the (Lutheran) Norwegian State Church and existed from 1867 until it merged with other organisations to form Normisjon in 2001. The Norwegian Santal Mission has operated schools and hospitals in India and Bhutan.

The organisation was the Norwegian branch of the Santal Mission of the Northern Churches, that was established by the Norwegian missionary Lars Olsen Skrefsrud and the Danish missionary Hans Peter Børresen. Similar organisations existed in Denmark, Sweden, the United Kingdom and the United States. Notable people affiliated with the Norwegian Santal Mission include Olav Hodne.

Between 1883 and 2001, the Norwegian Santal Mission published the journal Santalen ("The Santal").

Chairmen

Prior to 1883, the Norwegian Santal Mission consisted of local committees and lacked a national leadership. In 1883, a national central committee was formed. It was replaced by a national board from 1911. The chairmen were (incomplete):

1883–1887 Oscar Nissen
1887–1907 Bernhard Pauss
1911–1912 Joh. Baklund
1912–1917 Ole Hallesby
Hans Høeg

References

Christian missionary societies
Defunct organisations based in Norway
Charities based in Norway
Religious organizations established in 1867
Organizations disestablished in 2001